Monflorite-Lascasas is a village in Aragon, Spain. It is located in the Hoya de Huesca to the south-east of the provincial capital, Huesca. Along with the neighbouring municipality of Alcalá del Obispo it is the site of Huesca–Pirineos Airport.

References

External links
 www.caiaragon.com/Monflorite-Lascasas
 Chapter 6 Homage to Catalonia by George Orwell 1938

Municipalities in the Province of Huesca